Michael Jackson Talks ... to Oprah is an American television interview special that was broadcast by ABC on February 10, 1993. The special featured an interview between musician Michael Jackson and Oprah Winfrey, filmed at his Neverland Ranch in California.

The interview 

During the interview, Jackson denied multiple tabloid rumors surrounding his personal life, including that he had bought the bones of the Elephant Man ("Where am I gonna put some bones?"), or slept in a hyperbaric chamber. 

When asked by Winfrey about his changing appearance and rumors that he had underwent cosmetic surgery, Jackson stated that the only operation he had received was a nose job, but that he had also become uncomfortable with his appearance and was afraid to look at his face in mirrors. Addressing rumors he had been bleaching his skin to lighten it, Jackson publicly revealed that he had been diagnosed with vitiligo—a depigmentation of the skin. Despite this condition, Jackson stated that he was still "proud to be a Black American. I am proud of my race. I am proud of who I am."

Reminiscing about his childhood, Jackson stated that he often missed out on hanging out with others because of his commitments to a music career. He accused his father Joe Jackson of mentally and physically abusing him. 

Jackson stated that he had been dating actress Brooke Shields; when asked by Winfrey if he was a virgin, he refused to respond, explaining that "you can call me old-fashioned if you want, but to me that's very personal."

Reception 
A.C. Nielsen reported that the interview was seen by an average of 62 million viewers, which at the time was the twentieth-largest audience for a U.S. television program recorded by the company.

The special, along with his recent appearances at the 1993 American Music Awards, and the Super Bowl XXVII halftime show just days earlier, were contributing factors in a resurgence in sales for his current album Dangerous. After a further spike following an appearance at the Grammy Awards to accept the Grammy Legend Award, Dangerous eventually entered the top 10 on the Billboard 200.

References 

Michael Jackson
Oprah Winfrey
Harpo Productions
1993 in American television
1990s American television specials
American Broadcasting Company television specials